The following occurred in 1368 in China.

Incumbents
 Yuan dynasty – Ukhaghatu Khan Toghon Temür (Emperor Shun)
 Ming dynasty – Hongwu Emperor (1st year)

Events
 23 January – Zhu Yuanzhang claims the Mandate of Heaven and establishes the Ming dynasty, becoming Hongwu Emperor.
 Zhu sends an army toward the Yuan capital, Khanbaliq (present-day Beijing).

References

 
14th century in China